{{DISPLAYTITLE:C18H23NO3}}
The molecular formula C18H23NO3 (molar mass : 301.38 g/mol, exact mass : 301.167794) may refer to:

 3C-BZ, a psychedelic drug
 25H-NBOMe
 Dihydrocodeine, a semi-synthetic opioid analgesic
 Dihydroisocodeine
 Dobutamine
 Isoxsuprine
 Methyldihydromorphine
 Phenescaline
 Ractopamine
 Solpecainol